Ali Akbar Velayati (born 24 June 1945, Tehran) is an Iranian conservative politician and physician. He is currently member of the Expediency Discernment Council. Velayati is a distinguished professor at Shahid Beheshti University of Medical Sciences, senior adviser to the Supreme Leader in international affairs and head of the board of founders and the board of trustees of the Islamic Azad University.

He is also a member of Iranian Science and Culture Hall of Fame, Expediency Discernment Council's President of Center for Strategic Research, senior fellow of Iranian Academy of Medical Sciences, and also former member of Supreme Council of the Cultural Revolution. He is the secretary-general of the World Assembly of Islamic Awakening.

He was the Minister of Foreign Affairs for more than fifteen years from December 1981 to August 1997 under Prime Minister Mir-Hossein Mousavi and Presidents Ali Khamenei and Akbar Hashemi Rafsanjani. He is the first and only person to have held this position for more than ten years. He was a candidate in 2013 presidential election and lost, coming fifth out of the six candidates garnering 2,268,753 votes, which was 6.18% of the votes.

Early life and education
Velayati was born in Rostamabad village in Shemiran, Tehran, on 24 June 1945. He was matriculated into Tehran University of medical sciences in 1964. Velayati finished his studies in pediatrics before moving to Johns Hopkins University for a fellowship in infectious diseases. In the meantime, Velayati taught at university and was an active member of such influential body as the Supreme Council of Cultural Revolution. He is still a member of Expediency Council and Islamic Encyclopedia Foundation.

Career
In 1961, Velayeti joined the National Front, a secular party. Following the Iranian Revolution in 1979, he was elected as a member of the parliament from his home town in parliamentary election of that year. He was also a deputy minister of health from November 1980 to July 1981 in the cabinet of Mohammad-Ali Rajai.

After winning the presidential election on 13 October 1981, then President Ali Khamenei proposed Velayati as his prime minister to the Parliament of Iran, but Parliament voted against him on 22 October. Khamenei later proposed Mir-Hossein Mousavi, who gained Parliament's approval. In November 1986, Velayati argued that Iran should have diplomatic ties with all countries.

During the premiership of Mousavi, Velayati served as the minister of foreign affairs. After the election of Hashemi Rafsanjani as president, he retained his post until 1997, when Rafsanjani's term was ended. He has been an advisor on international affairs to the Supreme Leader of Iran since 1997.

AMIA bombing
In November 2006, Argentine Judge Rodolfo Canicoba Corra issued international arrest warrants for Velayati, six other Iranians and one Lebanese in connection with the bombing of the Asociación Mutual Israelita Argentina (AMIA) in Buenos Aires, which resulted in the death of 85 people and serious injuries to 151. Velayati has been on the official Wanted list of Interpol since March 2007, for allegations of "Aggravated Murder and Damages" related to the AMIA bombing. The arrest warrant is based on the allegation that senior Iranian officials planned the attack in an August 1993 meeting, including Khamanei, the Supreme Leader, Mohammad Hejazi, Khamanei's intelligence and security advisor, Rafsanjani, then president, Ali Fallahian, then intelligence minister, and Velayati, then foreign minister.

Later years
Velayeti was appointed to the Strategic Council on Foreign Relations in 2006. He appears to be close to Supreme Leader Ali Khamenei, serving as his advisor on international affairs and writing the introduction to Khamenei's book Palestine. He attended funeral service of Imad Mughniyah, who had been killed on 12 February 2008, representing Khamenei on 14 February in Lebanon.

On 30 October 2013, Velayati became head of Center for Strategic Research, being appointed by Ali Akbar Hashemi Rafsanjani. He was succeeded by Hassan Rouhani.

In November 2019, the United States Treasury Department has sanctioned Velayati.

Presidential campaigns

2005 presidential election
Velayati was under consideration by the conservative alliance of Iran as a possible candidate for 2005 presidential election, but he announced that he did not accept candidacy of the conservative alliance and would run as an Independent. He finally decided not to run. It was speculated that he did not want to run against Rafsanjani.

2013 presidential election
He announced his candidacy for the 2013 presidential election and was supported by some conservative groups. He promised a strong external relationship with community reconciliation, and more diplomatic relations with Europe and the United States. He also criticized President Ahmadinejad's foreign policy. He received 2,268,753 of the votes, coming in fifth place.

Personal life
On 12 March 2020, the Tasnim News Agency reported that Velayati had tested positive for COVID-19. He was reported to be under quarantine.

Works
Velayati has had a large number of books and academic works published, including:
 Dynamism of Islamic and Iranian Culture and Civilization
 Iran and the Question of Palestine
 Iran and the Developments of Palestine
 Historical Crisis of Iranian Identity
 Intellectual Prelude to Constitutional Movement
 History of Iran Foreign Relations under Shah Abbas Safavid I
 History of Iran Foreign Relations under Shah Ismail Safavid II
 Political History of the Iraqi Imposed War Against the Islamic Republic of Iran
 History of Iran Foreign Relations under Nasser addin Shah and Mozaffar addin Shah
 Tuberculosis
 Infectious Diseases

References

External links

|-

|-

1945 births
Living people
Johns Hopkins University alumni
Foreign ministers of Iran
Iranian infectious disease physicians
Central Council of the Islamic Republican Party members
Members of the Expediency Discernment Council
Candidates for President of Iran
People of the Iranian Revolution
Islamic Association of Physicians of Iran politicians
Recipients of the Order of Knowledge
National Front (Iran) student activists
Islamic Coalition Party politicians
Iranian Science and Culture Hall of Fame recipients in Medicine
Iranian individuals subject to the U.S. Department of the Treasury sanctions
Politicians from Tehran
Physicians from Tehran
Iranian Academy of Medical Sciences
Academic staff of Shahid Beheshti University of Medical Sciences